Air India One (also referred to as AI1 AIC1 or INDIA 1) is the air traffic control call sign of any Special Extra Section Flight (SESF) operated by the Indian Air Force (IAF) for the President of India, Vice President of India or Prime Minister of India. The IAF's Air Headquarters Communication Squadron, based at Air Force Station Palam, New Delhi is the unit responsible for coordinating the missions.

History
Initially, the Air India One was an Air India Boeing 747-400 which used to ferry the President, Vice President and the Prime Minister.

In 2016, the Boeing 777-300ER was selected as SESF (VVIP transport). The new aircraft, with specially-designed liveries, entered service in October 2020, replacing the Boeing 747-400s operated for the missions by Air India. Unlike the 747s which were commercial aircraft, the newly inducted aircraft are military vessels formally owned and operated by the Indian Air Force. They bear no Air India markings and have no commercial dual-use. However, under a special contract, they will be maintained by Air India Engineering Services Limited (AIESL), which has experience maintaining the Boeing 777 series aircraft for Air India's commercial fleet.

The aircraft are fitted with encrypted satellite communication facilities and advanced navigation aids, an advanced missile warning system, a missile deflecting shield and electronic countermeasures so as to provide protection from any ground-based or airborne threats and flares and glares for misleading the missile. They are capable of long-range travel removing the need for air-to-air refueling (which is a feature on the VC-25As though they have not been used at all in their service) . The 777-300ER's onboard electronics include about 238 miles of wiring (twice the amount found in a normal 777). The heavy shielding is crucial to protect the wiring and crucial electronics from the electromagnetic pulse associated with a nuclear blast.

At a Boeing facility in Fort Worth, Texas, two ex- Air India aircraft (VT-ALV and VT-ALW, now registered as K7066 and K7067 respectively) were specially outfitted with missile defense and countermeasures dispensing systems, including large aircraft infrared countermeasures (LAIRCM) self-protection suites (SPS).

On Air India One flights, the President is designated as VIP-1, the Vice President as VIP-2, and the Prime Minister as VIP-3. The BBJs have a four class configuration. For VIPs 1, 2 and 3, an executive enclosure in the aircraft includes an office and a bedroom. All other passengers aboard Air India One are required to wear colour-coded identity cards at all times. Members of the official delegation (at the rank of Joint Secretary to the Government of India and above) are tagged in purple and sit in first class. Personnel of the Special Protection Group are also tagged in purple to provide proximate security to the Prime Minister, and may carry close combat weapons for the duration of flights. Accompanying officials (passengers of rank below Joint Secretary) are tagged in pink, and sit in business class equivalent seats. Support staff, including cooks and butlers, and other security personnel (not including the Special Protection Group) are tagged in red, while journalists in the press pool are tagged in yellow. Both red and yellow-tagged passengers sit in economy class equivalent seats.

While Ministers of the Union and senior staff officers of the Indian Armed Forces may use smaller aircraft for official travel, the 777-300ER's are exclusively used by the President, Vice President and Prime Minister. Additional Indian Air Force VIP Aircraft  such as the B737 BBJ and ERJ-135 are also used by many government dignitaries (including the Prime Minister) for domestic and international medium-haul travel.

See also 
Air transports of heads of state and government

References

Presidential aircraft
Call signs
Boeing 747
Boeing 777